Morshedi (also Romanized as Morshedī; also known as Murshidi) is a village in Mazayjan Rural District, in the Central District of Bavanat County, Fars Province, Iran. At the 2006 census, its population was 636, in 158 families.

References 

Populated places in Bavanat County